The Senate Standing Committee on Legal and Constitutional Affairs (LCJC) is a standing committee of the Senate of Canada. It has jurisdiction over legislation and matters relating to legal and constitutional matters generally, including: (1) federal-provincial relations; (2) administration of justice, law reform and all related matters; (3) the judiciary; (4) all essentially juridical matters; and (5) private bills not otherwise specifically assigned to another committee, including those related to marriage and divorce (Rule 86(1)(k)).

Members 

The Representative of the Government in the Senate and Leader of the Opposition in the Senate are both ex-officio members of the committee.

External links
 

Committees of the Senate of Canada